The West Australian Symphony Orchestra (WASO) is an Australian symphony orchestra based in Perth, Western Australia.  Its principal concert venue is the Perth Concert Hall.  WASO also gives concerts at the Mandurah Performing Arts Centre. , WASO has a roster of 79 full-time musicians and presents over 170 performances per annum throughout the state. The orchestra has an affiliated WASO Chorus.

History
In the winter of 1921, weekly concerts by a Perth Symphony Orchestra, conducted by Harold Betteridge and led by Lionel Hart, were advertised in the local newspaper, but the life of this group was brief. In 1928, many professional musicians who had supported the silent movies found themselves out of work, and under the direction of Harold Newton, formed the Perth Symphony Orchestra. The first performance by this group of professional players was given in the Queens Hall of the Regent Theatre. By 1930, the orchestra not only gave concerts in the Queens Hall but also presented ten subscription concerts in the Town Hall. Many of these concerts were broadcast over the radio station 6WF.

In 1932, the Australian Broadcasting Commission (ABC) was formed (which eventually became the Australian Broadcasting Corporation), and part of its charter was to establish broadcast orchestras in each state. In Western Australia, it formed the Western Studio Orchestra of fifteen players, conducted by Nelson Burton. The Perth Symphony Orchestra, conducted by George Reid, was giving regular concerts in His Majesty's Theatre.

In 1936, the ABC introduced Celebrity Subscription Concerts, and artists and conductorsmany from overseaswere engaged. The concerts were performed initially in His Majesty's Theatre and then later in the Capitol Theatre and Winthrop Hall at the University of Western Australia. The Western Studio Orchestra became the Perth Concert orchestra, and this orchestra was later augmented for the celebrity concerts and became known as the ABC (Perth) Symphony Orchestra. By 1937, the letters "ABC" had been dropped from the title and the orchestra once again became known as the Perth Symphony Orchestra.

In 1950, the government of the day, with other municipal bodies, made funds available to subsidise the existing ABC Orchestra. By the end of that year, the West Australian Symphony Orchestra was born, boasting forty permanent members.  In 1997, the ABC divested all ABC orchestras from the Concerts department of the ABC into separate subsidiary companies, including a service company known as Symphony Australia.  The West Australian Symphony was incorporated in January 1998.  Since corporatising, the orchestra has diversified its performances, expanding on its summer outdoor season and taking music to many parts of the community. It has a creative partnership with the West Australian Opera and the West Australian Ballet.

WASO principal conductors have included Henry Krips (1948–1971), Tibor Paul (1971–1973), David Measham (1974–1981), and Jorge Mester (1991–1994).  Measham took the orchestra on its first overseas tour, to Singapore, and to the Sydney Festival. In 1975, he instigated the inaugural indoor season of three Promenade Concerts, modelled after The Proms, as part of the Perth International Arts Festival.  Measham also held the title of principal guest conductor from 1981 to 1986.  Vladimir Verbitsky became principal guest conductor in 1992 and conductor laureate in 1997.

Matthias Bamert was chief conductor from 2003 to 2006.  His initial contract with WASO was through 2007, but dissatisfaction with his tenure caused the orchestra to terminate his contract 18 months early, in May 2006. In May 2007, WASO named Paul Daniel its principal conductor, effective as of January 2009. He had made his guest conducting debut with the WASO in 1995, and returned in April 2006. In November 2010, the WASO announced the extension of Daniel's contract as principal conductor through December 2013, at which time his tenure concluded.  In May 2012, WASO announced the appointment of Asher Fisch as its newest principal conductor, effective 1 January 2014, with an initial contract of 3 years. In September 2015, the WASO announced the extension of Fisch's contract  With the WASO, Fisch has recorded the symphonies of Brahms.

Principal conductors
 Rudolf Pekarek (1951–1954)
 John Farnsworth Hall (1955–1965)
 Thomas Mayer (1965–1970)
 Tibor Paul (1971–1973)
 David Measham (1975–1981)
 Albert Rosen (1982–1985)
 Jorge Mester (1991–1993)
 Vernon Handley (1994–1997)
 Matthias Bamert (2003–2006)
 Paul Daniel (2009–2013)
 Asher Fisch (2014–

Awards and nominations

APRA-AMC Art Music Awards 

The APRA-AMC Art Music Awards (previously Classical Music Awards) are presented annually by Australasian Performing Right Association (APRA), Australasian Mechanical Copyright Owners Society (AMCOS) and Australian Music Centre (AMC) since 2002. They "honour the achievements of composers, performers and industry specialists in the contemporary classical genre."

{| class="wikitable sortable plainrowheaders"
|-
! scope="col" |Year
! scope="col" |Recipient / Nominated work
! scope="col" |Award
! scope="col" |Result
! scope="col" class="unsortable" |
|-
!scope="row" | 2004
| This Insubstantial Pageant (Gordon Kerry) – West Australian Symphony Orchestra
| Orchestral Work of the Year
| 
| 
|-
!scope="row" | 2004
| West Australian Symphony Orchestra
| Most Distinguished Contribution to the Presentation of Australian Composition by an Organisation
| 
| 
|-
!scope="row"| 2005
| The Dischord Hunter – West Australian Symphony Orchestra, Education Chamber Orchestra (WASO EChO)
| Outstanding Contribution to Australian Music in Education
| 
| 
|-
!scope="row"| 2006
| Line Drawing (James Ledger) – Genevieve Lacey, West Australian Symphony
| Best Performance of an Australian Composition
| 
| 
|-
!scope="row" | 2008
| Trumpet Concerto (James Ledger) – West Australian Symphony Orchestra, David Elton (trumpet), Sachio Fujioka (conductor)
| Orchestral Work of the Year
| 
| 
|-
!scope="row" | 2008
| Concerto Project – West Australian Symphony Orchestra
| Outstanding Contribution by an Organisation
| 
| 
|-
!scope="row"| 2009
| Symphony No. 7 Scenes from Daily Life (Carl Vine) – West Australian Symphony Orchestra
| Best Performance of an Australian Composition
| 
| 
|-
!scope="row"| 2011
| A Dream of Drowning (Andrew Ford / Tim Winton) – West Australian Symphony Orchestra, Teddy Tahu Rhodes (soloist), Paul Daniel (conductor)
| Work of the Year – Orchestral
| 
| 
|-
!scope="row"| 2011
| Chronicles (James Ledger) – West Australian Symphony Orchestra, Paul Daniel (conductor)
| Work of the Year – Orchestral
| 
| 
|-
!scope="row"| 2012
| Spirit Ground (Ross Edwards) – West Australian Symphony Orchestra, Margaret Blades (soloist)
| Work of the Year – Orchestral
| 
| 
|-
!scope="row"| 2012
| Two Memorials for Anton Webern and John Lennon (James Ledger) – West Australian Symphony Orchestra, Paul Daniel (conductor)
| Performance of the Year
| 
| 
|-
!scope="row"| 2014
| Golden Years (James Ledger) –  Margaret Blades (soloist), West Australian Symphony Orchestra, Otto Tausk (conductor)
| Work of the Year – Orchestral
| 
| 
|-
!scope="row"| 2014
| West Australian Symphony Orchestra – 2013 education program
| Award for Excellence in Music Education
| 
| 
|-
!scope="row"| 2015
| rowspan="2" | "Concerto for clarinet and orchestra" (Lachlan Skipworth) – West Australian Symphony Orchestra, Ashley Smith (soloist), Baldur Brönnimann (conductor)
| Orchestral Work of the Year
| 
| 
|-
!scope="row"| 2015
| Performance of the Year
| 
| 
|-
!scope="row"| 2015
| "Concerto for Orchestra" (Carl Vine) – West Australian Symphony Orchestra, Michael Stern (conductor)
| Performance of the Year
| 
| 
|-
!scope="row"| 2017
| West Australian Symphony Orchestra – 2016 education program
| Award for Excellence in Music Education
| 
| 
|-
!scope="row"| 2018
| "Concerto for Trombone and Orchestra" (Paul Stanhope) – Joshua Davis (trombone), West Australian Symphony Orchestra, Asher Fisch (conductor)
| Orchestral Work of the Year
| 
| 
|-
!scope="row"| 2018
| Spiritus (Lachlan Skipworth) – West Australian Symphony Orchestra, Daniel Blendulf (conductor)
| Orchestral Work of the Year
| 
| 
|-
!scope="row"| 2018
| Maali, op. 101 – "Concerto for oboe, clarinet, bassoon and horn with orchestra" (Andrew Schultz) – West Australian Symphony Orchestra and soloists; Simone Young (conductor)
| Performance of the Year
| 
| 
|-
!scope="row"| 2019
| Crescendo – West Australian Symphony Orchestra
| Excellence in Music Education
| 
| 
|-
!scope="row"| 2019
| Implacable Gifts (Concerto for Two Pianos and Orchestra) (Carl Vine) – West Australian Symphony Orchestra
| Orchestral Work of the Year
| 
| 
|-
!scope="row"| 2022
| Hymns for End Times (Rachael Dease) – West Australian Symphony Orchestra
| Performance of the Year: Notated Composition
| 
| 
|-

ARIA Music Awards
The ARIA Music Awards is an annual awards ceremony that recognises excellence, innovation, and achievement across all genres of Australian music. They commenced in 1987. 

! 
|-
| 1993
| The Transposed Heads
| Best Classical Album
| 
| 
|-

See also
Perth Symphony Orchestra
Symphony Australia

References

External links

 Weat Australian Ballet web site

APRA Award winners
Australian orchestras
Culture in Perth, Western Australia
Symphony orchestras
Musical groups established in 1928
1928 establishments in Australia